My Teenage Girl was a South Korean reality television show created by Munhwa Broadcasting Corporation. The show was intended to form a seven-member girl group with the potential to chart on Billboard. Out of 30,000 applications submitted around the world, 83 applicants were chosen to participate in the show and were divided into four age groups known as "grades". The contestants finishing in the top seven formed CLASS:y.

Contestants 
The spelling of names in English is according to the official website. The Korean contestants are presented in Eastern order (family name, given name). 

The age listed is according to the Korean age system at the start of the competition.

Color Key

Entrance Mission (Episodes 1–3)
The teams were formed based on age groups prior to the prequel season. Initially, a total of 10 contestants from each group would move on to the second mission. After a long discussion, it was ultimately decided that instead of 10 contestants, they would all have 16 each in order to match Grade 3 (the group with the most passers in the first mission). This allowed other groups to bring back contestants who were originally eliminated. As a result, one contestant returned to Grade 1; five to Grade 2; and three to Grade 4, bringing a total of 64 passers for the first round of the first mission.

Color key

Grade 1

Grade 2

Grade 3

Notes

Grade 4

Mid-Point Check (Episodes 3 and 4)
Before the performance in the second mission, only 40 contestants (10 from each group) would perform in the second mission, forcing the mentors to eliminate 24 contestants (6 from each group) from the show.

Color key

Grade 1

Grade 2

Grade 3

Notes

Grade 4

Grade Battle (Episodes 4 and 5)
Rules: The two contestants receiving the highest scores in their respective groups competed against each other in a second round known as the "Ace Battle". The two contestants receiving the lowest scores in their respective groups were nominated for elimination. The winning group was exempt from elimination and would be determined by adding the total scores from both rounds in the second mission. The nominee in the losing group was eliminated from the show.

Color Key

Grade 3 vs Grade 4

Grade 2 vs Grade 1

Concept Battle (Episodes 5 and 6)
This mission was based on the results from the previous mission. The winning groups (Grade 1 and Grade 4) competed for first place while the losing groups (Grade 2 and Grade 3) competed for third place. The groups ranked first and third were exempt from elimination while the groups ranked second and fourth faced elimination. Since this was a collaboration mission, the remaining contestants were divided into teams and must choose one of the three concepts assigned to their groups. After each performance, the scores from each remaining contestant were added to the group's total score and the group ranked first would take the second spot in the forming group. The two contestants, one from each losing group, with the least online votes were eliminated from the show.

Color Key

Third Place Battle: Grade 3 vs Grade 2

First Place Battle: Grade 1 vs Grade 4

Position Battle (Episodes 7 and 8) 
Color Key

Representative Selection (Episodes 8 and 9)
Color Key

Representative Takeover (Episodes 10 and 11) 
Color Key

Final Mission (Episode 12) 
Color Key

Notes 
 Grade 4 member Myung Hyung-seo is a former member of Busters. She left the group in 2020 to focus on her studies.
 Grade 4 member Lee Mi-hee is a member of Botopass.
 Grade 4 member Bang Sun-hee is a member of Girlkind under her stage name, Ellyn.
 Grade 4 member Song Ye-rim is a former Dancing High contestant.
 Grade 1 members Kim Seon-you and Jung Si-woo are former Cap-Teen contestants.
 Grade 3 member Kim Ji-yeon is a former SG Entertainment trainee and former member of pre-debut groups Alpha Ray and SG Girls.
 Grade 1 member Choi Da-sol is a member of Little Cheer Girl.

References 

My Teenage Girl contestants